Cure Alzheimer's Fund (CAF) is an American non-profit organization based in Wellesley, Massachusetts. It supports and funds research focusing on understanding and potentially curing Alzheimer's disease utilizing a venture philanthropy approach, targeting research with the highest probability of preventing, slowing or reversing Alzheimer's disease. The board of directors covers all operating costs so that all donations go entirely to research.

History
Cure Alzheimer's Fund (also known as Alzheimer's Disease Research Foundation) was founded in 2004 by Jeffrey Morby, Jacqui Morby, Henry McCance, and Phyllis Rappaport as a way to fund research of Alzheimer's disease. Its CEO is Timothy Armour. The board of directors also includes investment banker Robert Greenhill, founder of Greenhill & Co. During 2021, Cure Alzheimer's Fund received $28.2 million through 24,000 donations. As of April 2022, the organization has funded 615 research projects, for more than $145 million.

Events

Symposium

Cure Alzheimer's Fund webinars throughout the calendar year. Recent presenters have included Drs. Rudy Tanzi, David Holtzman, Robert Vassar, and Erik Musiek

Funded research programs

Cure Alzheimer's Fund's research objective is to support studies that will bring forward a further understanding of Alzheimer's disease and/or a development of treatment.

As a non-profit, CAF provides grants to the world's leading researchers.

All projects are based upon Cure Alzheimer's roadmap of discovery. This roadmap includes four steps needed to develop effective therapies: foundational genetics, translational research, drug discovery, and drug development.

Alzheimer's Genome Project
The Alzheimer's Genome Project (AGP)  is one of CAF's longest continued projects, with approximately $9,041,400 in funding from 2005 to 2013 for research directed by Rudolph Tanzi, Ph.D., of Harvard Medical School and Massachusetts General Hospital. Its objective is to evaluate new Alzheimer's disease gene candidates for effects on Alzheimer's pathology and related biological pathways.
Phase I of the AGP focused on identifying all genes that contribute significant risk for Alzheimer's disease, thereby identifying more targets for the development of therapeutic interventions. Phase I was completed in 2008, with the identification of the novel Alzheimer's genes ADAM10, ATXN1, and CD33. Phase II of the AGP entails the functional analysis of these genes.

Phase III of the AGP focuses on the processing and sequencing of the complete genomes, then identifying all DNA variants in the genome that directly influence risk of Alzheimer's disease. From there, all of the biologically relevant genomes that may cause Alzheimer's can be identified and targeted for the development of therapeutic treatments.
The Alzheimer's Genome Project was the largest single disease scan of all time and was considered one of the top ten medical breakthroughs in the world in 2008 by Time magazine.

Charity assessment
The board of directors covers all operating costs so that all donations go entirely to research. In 2018, the annual compensation of the president/CEO was $238,131 (1.25% of expenses). Cure Alzheimer's Fund has a maximum rating of 4 stars (out of 4) from Charity Navigator, with an overall score of 98.23/100 for financial, accountability and transparency.

References

External links 
 

Mental health organizations in Massachusetts
Alzheimer's and dementia organizations